Pallo-Pojat Juniorit (abbreviated PPJ) is a football club in Helsinki. Pallo-Pojat operates in southern Helsinki. Club mainly focuses on youth football but also has adults teams for men and women. Pallo-Pojat won finnish cup in 1956. They played in Mestaruussarja in 1960 and 1961 seasons but weren't able to compete with bigger traditional Helsinki based clubs HIFK, HJK, HPS and KIF and were relegated to lower levels. In 1995 Clubs youth department were separated from rest of the club and named Pallo-Pojat Juniorit, as of 2020 this club continues the tradition of the original Pallo-Pojat.

Honours 
Finnish Cup: 1956

Season to season

{|  class="wikitable"
|- style="background:#f0f6fa;"
!Season
!Level
!Division
!Section
!Administration
!Position
!Movements
|-
|style="background:#77DD77;"|1938
|style="background:#77DD77;"|Tier 3
|style="background:#77DD77;"|Maakuntasarja (Third Division)
|style="background:#77DD77;"|West, Southern
|style="background:#77DD77;"|Finnish FA (Suomen Pallolitto)
|style="background:#77DD77;"| 
|style="background:#77DD77;"|Promotion Playoff - Promoted
|-
|style="background:#87CEFA;"|1939
|style="background:#87CEFA;"|Tier 2
|style="background:#87CEFA;"|Itä-Länsi-sarja (Second Division)
|style="background:#87CEFA;"|West League, Group 1
|style="background:#87CEFA;"|Finnish FA (Suomen Palloliitto)
|style="background:#87CEFA;"|3rd
|style="background:#87CEFA;"|
|-
|style="background:#77DD77;"|1940-41
|style="background:#77DD77;"|Tier 3
|style="background:#77DD77;"|C-Sarja (Third Division)
|style="background:#77DD77;"|Group 1
|style="background:#77DD77;"|Finnish FA (Suomen Pallolitto)
|style="background:#77DD77;"|4th
|style="background:#77DD77;"|
|-
|style="background:#87CEFA;"|1945
|style="background:#87CEFA;"|Tier 2
|style="background:#87CEFA;"|Suomensarja (Second Division)
|style="background:#87CEFA;"|Group A
|style="background:#87CEFA;"|Finnish FA (Suomen Palloliitto)
|style="background:#87CEFA;"|5th
|style="background:#87CEFA;"|Relegated
|-
|style="background:#77DD77;"|1945-46
|style="background:#77DD77;"|Tier 3
|style="background:#77DD77;"|Maakuntasarja (Third Division)
|style="background:#77DD77;"|Helsinki Group II
|style="background:#77DD77;"|Finnish FA (Suomen Pallolitto)
|style="background:#77DD77;"| 1st
|style="background:#77DD77;"|Promotion Playoff
|-
|style="background:#77DD77;"|1946-47
|style="background:#77DD77;"|Tier 3
|style="background:#77DD77;"|Maakuntasarja (Third Division)
|style="background:#77DD77;"|Helsinki Group I
|style="background:#77DD77;"|Finnish FA (Suomen Pallolitto)
|style="background:#77DD77;"| 4th
|style="background:#77DD77;"|
|-
|style="background:#77DD77;"|1947-48
|style="background:#77DD77;"|Tier 3
|style="background:#77DD77;"|Maakuntasarja (Third Division)
|style="background:#77DD77;"|Helsinki Group II
|style="background:#77DD77;"|Finnish FA (Suomen Pallolitto)
|style="background:#77DD77;"| 6th
|style="background:#77DD77;"|Relegated
|-
|style="background:;"|1948-49
|style="background:;"|
|style="background:;"|Piirinsarja (District Leagues)
|style="background:;"|
|style="background:;"|Helsinki District (SPL Helsinki)
|style="background:;"| 
|style="background:;"|
|-
|style="background:#FF7F00;"|1950
|style="background:#FF7F00;"|Tier 4
|style="background:#FF7F00;"|Piirinsarja (District League)
|style="background:#FF7F00;"|South Group
|style="background:#FF7F00;"|Helsinki District (SPL Helsinki)
|style="background:#FF7F00;"|
|style="background:#FF7F00;"|Promotion Playoff - Promoted
|-
|style="background:#77DD77;"|1951
|style="background:#77DD77;"|Tier 3
|style="background:#77DD77;"|Maakuntasarja (Third Division)
|style="background:#77DD77;"|South Group A
|style="background:#77DD77;"|Finnish FA (Suomen Pallolitto)
|style="background:#77DD77;"| 2nd
|style="background:#77DD77;"|
|-
|style="background:#77DD77;"|1952
|style="background:#77DD77;"|Tier 3
|style="background:#77DD77;"|Maakuntasarja (Third Division)
|style="background:#77DD77;"|South Group A
|style="background:#77DD77;"|Finnish FA (Suomen Pallolitto)
|style="background:#77DD77;"| 1st
|style="background:#77DD77;"|Promotion Group East 4th
|-
|style="background:#77DD77;"|1953
|style="background:#77DD77;"|Tier 3
|style="background:#77DD77;"|Maakuntasarja (Third Division)
|style="background:#77DD77;"|South Group A
|style="background:#77DD77;"|Finnish FA (Suomen Pallolitto)
|style="background:#77DD77;"| 1st
|style="background:#77DD77;"|Promotion Group East 2nd - Promoted
|-
|style="background:#87CEFA;"|1954
|style="background:#87CEFA;"|Tier 2
|style="background:#87CEFA;"|Suomensarja (Second Division)
|style="background:#87CEFA;"|East Group
|style="background:#87CEFA;"|Finnish FA (Suomen Palloliitto)
|style="background:#87CEFA;"|4th
|style="background:#87CEFA;"|
|-
|style="background:#87CEFA;"|1955
|style="background:#87CEFA;"|Tier 2
|style="background:#87CEFA;"|Suomensarja (Second Division)
|style="background:#87CEFA;"|East Group
|style="background:#87CEFA;"|Finnish FA (Suomen Palloliitto)
|style="background:#87CEFA;"|2nd
|style="background:#87CEFA;"|
|-
|style="background:#87CEFA;"|1956
|style="background:#87CEFA;"|Tier 2
|style="background:#87CEFA;"|Suomensarja (Second Division)
|style="background:#87CEFA;"|East Group
|style="background:#87CEFA;"|Finnish FA (Suomen Palloliitto)
|style="background:#87CEFA;"|6th
|style="background:#87CEFA;"|
|-
|style="background:#87CEFA;"|1957
|style="background:#87CEFA;"|Tier 2
|style="background:#87CEFA;"|Suomensarja (Second Division)
|style="background:#87CEFA;"|East Group
|style="background:#87CEFA;"|Finnish FA (Suomen Palloliitto)
|style="background:#87CEFA;"|4th
|style="background:#87CEFA;"|
|-
|style="background:#87CEFA;"|1958
|style="background:#87CEFA;"|Tier 2
|style="background:#87CEFA;"|Suomensarja (Second Division)
|style="background:#87CEFA;"|South Group
|style="background:#87CEFA;"|Finnish FA (Suomen Palloliitto)
|style="background:#87CEFA;"|1st
|style="background:#87CEFA;"|Promoted
|-
|style="background:#FFFF00;"|1959
|style="background:#FFFF00;"|Tier 1
|style="background:#FFFF00;"|Mestaruussarja (Premier Division)
|style="background:#FFFF00;"|
|style="background:#FFFF00;"|Finnish FA (Suomen Palloliitto)
|style="background:#FFFF00;"|9th
|style="background:#FFFF00;"|
|-
|style="background:#FFFF00;"|1960
|style="background:#FFFF00;"|Tier 1
|style="background:#FFFF00;"|Mestaruussarja (Premier Division)
|style="background:#FFFF00;"|
|style="background:#FFFF00;"|Finnish FA (Suomen Palloliitto)
|style="background:#FFFF00;"|7th
|style="background:#FFFF00;"|
|-
|style="background:#FFFF00;"|1961
|style="background:#FFFF00;"|Tier 1
|style="background:#FFFF00;"|Mestaruussarja (Premier Division)
|style="background:#FFFF00;"|
|style="background:#FFFF00;"|Finnish FA (Suomen Palloliitto)
|style="background:#FFFF00;"|11th
|style="background:#FFFF00;"|Relegated
|-
|style="background:#87CEFA;"|1962
|style="background:#87CEFA;"|Tier 2
|style="background:#87CEFA;"|Suomensarja (Second Division)
|style="background:#87CEFA;"|East Group
|style="background:#87CEFA;"|Finnish FA (Suomen Palloliitto)
|style="background:#87CEFA;"|8th
|style="background:#87CEFA;"|
|-
|style="background:#87CEFA;"|1963
|style="background:#87CEFA;"|Tier 2
|style="background:#87CEFA;"|Suomensarja (Second Division)
|style="background:#87CEFA;"|East Group
|style="background:#87CEFA;"|Finnish FA (Suomen Palloliitto)
|style="background:#87CEFA;"|6th
|style="background:#87CEFA;"|
|-
|style="background:#87CEFA;"|1964
|style="background:#87CEFA;"|Tier 2
|style="background:#87CEFA;"|Suomensarja (Second Division)
|style="background:#87CEFA;"|East Group
|style="background:#87CEFA;"|Finnish FA (Suomen Palloliitto)
|style="background:#87CEFA;"|7th
|style="background:#87CEFA;"|
|-
|style="background:#87CEFA;"|1965
|style="background:#87CEFA;"|Tier 2
|style="background:#87CEFA;"|Suomensarja (Second Division)
|style="background:#87CEFA;"|East Group
|style="background:#87CEFA;"|Finnish FA (Suomen Palloliitto)
|style="background:#87CEFA;"|10th
|style="background:#87CEFA;"|Relegation Playoff - Relegated
|-
|style="background:#77DD77;"|1966
|style="background:#77DD77;"|Tier 3
|style="background:#77DD77;"|Maakuntasarja (Third Division)
|style="background:#77DD77;"|Group 1
|style="background:#77DD77;"|Finnish FA (Suomen Pallolitto)
|style="background:#77DD77;"| 6th
|style="background:#77DD77;"|
|-
|style="background:#77DD77;"|1967
|style="background:#77DD77;"|Tier 3
|style="background:#77DD77;"|Maakuntasarja (Third Division)
|style="background:#77DD77;"|Group 1
|style="background:#77DD77;"|Finnish FA (Suomen Pallolitto)
|style="background:#77DD77;"| 6th
|style="background:#77DD77;"|
|-
|style="background:#77DD77;"|1968
|style="background:#77DD77;"|Tier 3
|style="background:#77DD77;"|Maakuntasarja (Third Division)
|style="background:#77DD77;"|Group 1
|style="background:#77DD77;"|Finnish FA (Suomen Pallolitto)
|style="background:#77DD77;"| 4th
|style="background:#77DD77;"|
|-
|style="background:#77DD77;"|1969
|style="background:#77DD77;"|Tier 3
|style="background:#77DD77;"|Maakuntasarja (Third Division)
|style="background:#77DD77;"|Group 1
|style="background:#77DD77;"|Finnish FA (Suomen Pallolitto)
|style="background:#77DD77;"| 7th
|style="background:#77DD77;"|
|-
|style="background:#77DD77;"|1970
|style="background:#77DD77;"|Tier 3
|style="background:#77DD77;"|III Divisioona (Third Division)
|style="background:#77DD77;"|Group 1
|style="background:#77DD77;"|Finnish FA (Suomen Pallolitto)
|style="background:#77DD77;"| 2nd
|style="background:#77DD77;"|
|-
|style="background:#77DD77;"|1971
|style="background:#77DD77;"|Tier 3
|style="background:#77DD77;"|III Divisioona (Third Division)
|style="background:#77DD77;"|Group 4
|style="background:#77DD77;"|Finnish FA (Suomen Pallolitto)
|style="background:#77DD77;"| 9th
|style="background:#77DD77;"|
|-
|style="background:#77DD77;"|1972
|style="background:#77DD77;"|Tier 3
|style="background:#77DD77;"|III Divisioona (Third Division)
|style="background:#77DD77;"|Group 1
|style="background:#77DD77;"|Finnish FA (Suomen Pallolitto)
|style="background:#77DD77;"| 9th
|style="background:#77DD77;"|Relegation Group I 1st
|-
|style="background:#FF7F00;"|1973
|style="background:#FF7F00;"|Tier 4
|style="background:#FF7F00;"|III Divisioona (Third Division)
|style="background:#FF7F00;"|Group 1
|style="background:#FF7F00;"|Finnish FA (Suomen Pallolitto)
|style="background:#FF7F00;"|3rd
|style="background:#FF7F00;"|
|-
|style="background:#FF7F00;"|1974
|style="background:#FF7F00;"|Tier 4
|style="background:#FF7F00;"|III Divisioona (Third Division)
|style="background:#FF7F00;"|Group 2
|style="background:#FF7F00;"|Finnish FA (Suomen Pallolitto)
|style="background:#FF7F00;"|4th
|style="background:#FF7F00;"|
|-
|style="background:#FF7F00;"|1975
|style="background:#FF7F00;"|Tier 4
|style="background:#FF7F00;"|III Divisioona (Third Division)
|style="background:#FF7F00;"|Group 2
|style="background:#FF7F00;"|Finnish FA (Suomen Pallolitto)
|style="background:#FF7F00;"|9th
|style="background:#FF7F00;"|Relegated
|-
|style="background:#CECE1B;"|1976
|style="background:#CECE1B;"|Tier 5
|style="background:#CECE1B;"|IV Divisioona (Fourth Division)
|style="background:#CECE1B;"|Group 1
|style="background:#CECE1B;"|Finnish FA (Suomen Pallolitto)
|style="background:#CECE1B;"|1st
|style="background:#CECE1B;"|Promoted
|-
|style="background:#FF7F00;"|1977
|style="background:#FF7F00;"|Tier 4
|style="background:#FF7F00;"|III Divisioona (Third Division)
|style="background:#FF7F00;"|Group 2
|style="background:#FF7F00;"|Finnish FA (Suomen Pallolitto)
|style="background:#FF7F00;"|9th
|style="background:#FF7F00;"|Relegation Playoff - Relegated
|-
|style="background:#CECE1B;"|1978
|style="background:#CECE1B;"|Tier 5
|style="background:#CECE1B;"|IV Divisioona (Fourth Division)
|style="background:#CECE1B;"|Group 4
|style="background:#CECE1B;"|Finnish FA (Suomen Pallolitto)
|style="background:#CECE1B;"|4th
|style="background:#CECE1B;"|
|-
|style="background:#CECE1B;"|1979
|style="background:#CECE1B;"|Tier 5
|style="background:#CECE1B;"|IV Divisioona (Fourth Division)
|style="background:#CECE1B;"|Group 3
|style="background:#CECE1B;"|Finnish FA (Suomen Pallolitto)
|style="background:#CECE1B;"|3rd
|style="background:#CECE1B;"|
|-
|style="background:#CECE1B;"|1980
|style="background:#CECE1B;"|Tier 5
|style="background:#CECE1B;"|IV Divisioona (Fourth Division)
|style="background:#CECE1B;"|Group 3
|style="background:#CECE1B;"|Finnish FA (Suomen Pallolitto)
|style="background:#CECE1B;"|3rd
|style="background:#CECE1B;"|
|-
|style="background:#CECE1B;"|1981
|style="background:#CECE1B;"|Tier 5
|style="background:#CECE1B;"|IV Divisioona (Fourth Division)
|style="background:#CECE1B;"|Group 1
|style="background:#CECE1B;"|Finnish FA (Suomen Pallolitto)
|style="background:#CECE1B;"|4th
|style="background:#CECE1B;"|
|-
|style="background:#CECE1B;"|1982
|style="background:#CECE1B;"|Tier 5
|style="background:#CECE1B;"|IV Divisioona (Fourth Division)
|style="background:#CECE1B;"|Group 2
|style="background:#CECE1B;"|Finnish FA (Suomen Pallolitto)
|style="background:#CECE1B;"|2nd
|style="background:#CECE1B;"|Promotion Playoff
|-
|style="background:#CECE1B;"|1983
|style="background:#CECE1B;"|Tier 5
|style="background:#CECE1B;"|IV Divisioona (Fourth Division)
|style="background:#CECE1B;"|Group 1
|style="background:#CECE1B;"|Finnish FA (Suomen Pallolitto)
|style="background:#CECE1B;"|4th
|style="background:#CECE1B;"|
|-
|style="background:#CECE1B;"|1984
|style="background:#CECE1B;"|Tier 5
|style="background:#CECE1B;"|IV Divisioona (Fourth Division)
|style="background:#CECE1B;"|Group 3
|style="background:#CECE1B;"|Finnish FA (Suomen Pallolitto)
|style="background:#CECE1B;"|2nd
|style="background:#CECE1B;"|Promotion Playoff - Promoted
|-
|style="background:#FF7F00;"|1985
|style="background:#FF7F00;"|Tier 4
|style="background:#FF7F00;"|III Divisioona (Third Division)
|style="background:#FF7F00;"|Group 1
|style="background:#FF7F00;"|Finnish FA (Suomen Pallolitto)
|style="background:#FF7F00;"|5th
|style="background:#FF7F00;"|
|-
|style="background:#FF7F00;"|1986
|style="background:#FF7F00;"|Tier 4
|style="background:#FF7F00;"|III Divisioona (Third Division)
|style="background:#FF7F00;"|Group 2
|style="background:#FF7F00;"|Finnish FA (Suomen Pallolitto)
|style="background:#FF7F00;"|6th
|style="background:#FF7F00;"|
|-
|style="background:#FF7F00;"|1987
|style="background:#FF7F00;"|Tier 4
|style="background:#FF7F00;"|III Divisioona (Third Division)
|style="background:#FF7F00;"|Group 2
|style="background:#FF7F00;"|Finnish FA (Suomen Pallolitto)
|style="background:#FF7F00;"|5th
|style="background:#FF7F00;"|
|-
|style="background:#FF7F00;"|1988
|style="background:#FF7F00;"|Tier 4
|style="background:#FF7F00;"|III Divisioona (Third Division)
|style="background:#FF7F00;"|Group 1
|style="background:#FF7F00;"|Finnish FA (Suomen Pallolitto)
|style="background:#FF7F00;"|1st
|style="background:#FF7F00;"|Promoted
|-
|style="background:#77DD77;"|1989
|style="background:#77DD77;"|Tier 3
|style="background:#77DD77;"|II Divisioona (Second Division)
|style="background:#77DD77;"|East Group
|style="background:#77DD77;"|Finnish FA (Suomen Pallolitto)
|style="background:#77DD77;"| 11th
|style="background:#77DD77;"|Relegated
|-
|style="background:#FF7F00;"|1990
|style="background:#FF7F00;"|Tier 4
|style="background:#FF7F00;"|III Divisioona (Third Division)
|style="background:#FF7F00;"|Group 2
|style="background:#FF7F00;"|Finnish FA (Suomen Pallolitto)
|style="background:#FF7F00;"|12th
|style="background:#FF7F00;"|Relegated
|-
|style="background:#CECE1B;"|1991
|style="background:#CECE1B;"|Tier 5
|style="background:#CECE1B;"|IV Divisioona (Fourth Division)
|style="background:#CECE1B;"|Group 3
|style="background:#CECE1B;"|Helsinki District (SPL Helsinki)
|style="background:#CECE1B;"|10th
|style="background:#CECE1B;"|
|-
|style="background:#CECE1B;"|1992
|style="background:#CECE1B;"|Tier 5
|style="background:#CECE1B;"|IV Divisioona (Fourth Division)
|style="background:#CECE1B;"|Group 1
|style="background:#CECE1B;"|Helsinki District (SPL Helsinki)
|style="background:#CECE1B;"|11th
|style="background:#CECE1B;"|Relegated
|-
|style="background:;"|1993-97
|style="background:;"|Unknown
|style="background:;"|
|style="background:;"|
|style="background:;"|
|style="background:;"|
|style="background:;"|
|-
|style="background:#FBA0E3;"|1998
|style="background:#FBA0E3;"|Tier 6
|style="background:#FBA0E3;"|Vitonen (Fifth Division)
|style="background:#FBA0E3;"|
|style="background:#FBA0E3;"|Helsinki District (SPL Helsinki)
|style="background:#FBA0E3;"|
|style="background:#FBA0E3;"|
|-
|style="background:#CECE1B;"|1999
|style="background:#CECE1B;"|Tier 5
|style="background:#CECE1B;"|Nelonen (Fourth Division)
|style="background:#CECE1B;"|Group 3
|style="background:#CECE1B;"|Helsinki District (SPL Helsinki)
|style="background:#CECE1B;"|9th
|style="background:#CECE1B;"|
|-
|style="background:#CECE1B;"|2000
|style="background:#CECE1B;"|Tier 5
|style="background:#CECE1B;"|Nelonen (Fourth Division)
|style="background:#CECE1B;"|Group 3
|style="background:#CECE1B;"|Helsinki District (SPL Helsinki)
|style="background:#CECE1B;"|1st
|style="background:#CECE1B;"|Promoted
|-
|style="background:#FF7F00;"|2001
|style="background:#FF7F00;"|Tier 4
|style="background:#FF7F00;"|Kolmonen (Third Division)
|style="background:#FF7F00;"|Group 2
|style="background:#FF7F00;"|Helsinki District (SPL Helsinki)
|style="background:#FF7F00;"|11th
|style="background:#FF7F00;"|Relegated
|-
|style="background:#CECE1B;"|2002
|style="background:#CECE1B;"|Tier 5
|style="background:#CECE1B;"|Nelonen (Fourth Division)
|style="background:#CECE1B;"|Group 1
|style="background:#CECE1B;"|Helsinki District (SPL Helsinki)
|style="background:#CECE1B;"|5th
|style="background:#CECE1B;"|
|-
|style="background:#CECE1B;"|2003
|style="background:#CECE1B;"|Tier 5
|style="background:#CECE1B;"|Nelonen (Fourth Division)
|style="background:#CECE1B;"|Group 1
|style="background:#CECE1B;"|Helsinki District (SPL Helsinki)
|style="background:#CECE1B;"|1st
|style="background:#CECE1B;"|Promoted
|-
|style="background:#FF7F00;"|2004
|style="background:#FF7F00;"|Tier 4
|style="background:#FF7F00;"|Kolmonen (Third Division)
|style="background:#FF7F00;"|Group 2
|style="background:#FF7F00;"|Helsinki District (SPL Helsinki)
|style="background:#FF7F00;"|11th
|style="background:#FF7F00;"|Relegated
|-
|style="background:#CECE1B;"|2005
|style="background:#CECE1B;"|Tier 5
|style="background:#CECE1B;"|Nelonen (Fourth Division)
|style="background:#CECE1B;"|Group 1
|style="background:#CECE1B;"|Helsinki District (SPL Helsinki)
|style="background:#CECE1B;"|4th
|style="background:#CECE1B;"|
|-
|style="background:#CECE1B;"|2006
|style="background:#CECE1B;"|Tier 5
|style="background:#CECE1B;"|Nelonen (Fourth Division)
|style="background:#CECE1B;"|Group 1
|style="background:#CECE1B;"|Helsinki District (SPL Helsinki)
|style="background:#CECE1B;"|10th
|style="background:#CECE1B;"|
|-
|style="background:#CECE1B;"|2007
|style="background:#CECE1B;"|Tier 5
|style="background:#CECE1B;"|Nelonen (Fourth Division)
|style="background:#CECE1B;"|Group 1
|style="background:#CECE1B;"|Helsinki District (SPL Helsinki)
|style="background:#CECE1B;"|10th
|style="background:#CECE1B;"|
|-
|style="background:#CECE1B;"|2008
|style="background:#CECE1B;"|Tier 5
|style="background:#CECE1B;"|Nelonen (Fourth Division)
|style="background:#CECE1B;"|Group 2
|style="background:#CECE1B;"|Helsinki District (SPL Helsinki)
|style="background:#CECE1B;"|11th
|style="background:#CECE1B;"|Relegated
|-
|style="background:#FBA0E3;"|2013
|style="background:#FBA0E3;"|Tier 6
|style="background:#FBA0E3;"|Vitonen (Fifth Division)
|style="background:#FBA0E3;"|Group 2
|style="background:#FBA0E3;"|Helsinki District (SPL Helsinki)
|style="background:#FBA0E3;"|2nd
|style="background:#FBA0E3;"|Promoted
|-
|style="background:#CECE1B;"|2014
|style="background:#CECE1B;"|Tier 5
|style="background:#CECE1B;"|Nelonen (Fourth Division)
|style="background:#CECE1B;"|Group 1
|style="background:#CECE1B;"|Helsinki District (SPL Helsinki)
|style="background:#CECE1B;"|1st
|style="background:#CECE1B;"|Promoted PPJ Lauttasaari
|-
|style="background:#FF7F00;"|2015
|style="background:#FF7F00;"|Tier 4
|style="background:#FF7F00;"|Kolmonen (Third Division)
|style="background:#FF7F00;"|Group 2
|style="background:#FF7F00;"|Helsinki District (SPL Helsinki)
|style="background:#FF7F00;"|9th
|style="background:#FF7F00;"|
|-
|style="background:#FF7F00;"|2016
|style="background:#FF7F00;"|Tier 4
|style="background:#FF7F00;"|Kolmonen (Third Division)
|style="background:#FF7F00;"|Group 1
|style="background:#FF7F00;"|Helsinki District (SPL Helsinki)
|style="background:#FF7F00;"|2nd
|style="background:#FF7F00;"|
|-
|style="background:#FF7F00;"|2017
|style="background:#FF7F00;"|Tier 4
|style="background:#FF7F00;"|Kolmonen (Third Division)
|style="background:#FF7F00;"|Group 2
|style="background:#FF7F00;"|Helsinki District (SPL Helsinki)
|style="background:#FF7F00;"|11th
|style="background:#FF7F00;"|Relegated
|-
|style="background:#CECE1B;"|2018
|style="background:#CECE1B;"|Tier 5
|style="background:#CECE1B;"|Nelonen (Fourth Division)
|style="background:#CECE1B;"|Group 1
|style="background:#CECE1B;"|Helsinki District (SPL Helsinki)
|style="background:#CECE1B;"|4th
|style="background:#CECE1B;"|
|-
|style="background:#CECE1B;"|2019
|style="background:#CECE1B;"|Tier 5
|style="background:#CECE1B;"|Nelonen (Fourth Division)
|style="background:#CECE1B;"|Group 3
|style="background:#CECE1B;"|Helsinki District (SPL Helsinki)
|style="background:#CECE1B;"|3rd
|style="background:#CECE1B;"|
|-
|style="background:#CECE1B;"|2020
|style="background:#CECE1B;"|Tier 5
|style="background:#CECE1B;"|Nelonen (Fourth Division)
|style="background:#CECE1B;"|Group 2
|style="background:#CECE1B;"|Southern 
|style="background:#CECE1B;"|2nd
|style="background:#CECE1B;"|Promoted
|-
|style="background:#FF7F00;"|2021
|style="background:#FF7F00;"|Tier 4
|style="background:#FF7F00;"|Kolmonen (Third Division)
|style="background:#FF7F00;"|Group B 
|style="background:#FF7F00;"|Southern 
|style="background:#FF7F00;"|'|style="background:#FF7F00;"|
|}3 seasons in Mestaruussarja11 seasons in Suomensarja/Ykkönen16 seasons in Maakuntasarja/Kakkonen16 seasons in Kolmonen22 seasons in Nelonen2''' seasons in Vitonen''

References and sources

Official Website
Finnish Wikipedia

Football clubs in Helsinki
Association football clubs established in 1935
1935 establishments in Finland